Douglas H. Fisher (born April 28, 1947) is an American Democratic Party politician who has served since 2009 as the New Jersey Secretary of Agriculture, having been initially confirmed by Governor Jon Corzine and carried over by both Chris Christie and Phil Murphy. He served in the New Jersey General Assembly from 2002 to 2009, representing the 3rd legislative district.

Education
Fisher graduated with a B.S. Business Administration from Bryant University in Rhode Island.

Career

Early career
Fisher served on the South Jersey Economic Development District from 1995-2001 and the South Jersey Transportation Planning Organization, also from 1995-2001. Fisher served on the Cumberland County Board of Chosen Freeholders from 1996-2000, and was President of the South Jersey Freeholder Association in 1999. He served on the Bridgeton City Council from 1990-1992. Fisher is the former President of the Bridgeton Historical and Cultural Commission. Fisher served in the New Jersey National Guard from 1969-1975.

General Assembly
Fisher served in the Assembly on the Agriculture and Natural Resources (as Chair), the Regulated Professions Committee, the Telecommunications and Utilities Committee and the Intergovernmental Relations Commission.

New Jersey Secretary of Agriculture
The New Jersey Board of Agriculture voted in February 2009 to nominate Fisher for the position of New Jersey Secretary of Agriculture, 6-2. Governor Jon S. Corzine confirmed the nomination and Fisher was sworn in on March 7, 2009. Fisher retained the role during the governorship of Chris Christie and was also chosen by incoming governor Phil Murphy to continue in the position; the position of Agriculture Secretary does not require confirmation by the New Jersey Senate and has traditionally been retained after a changeover in governor.

References

External links
Secretary of Agriculture, New Jersey Department of Agriculture
New Jersey Legislature financial disclosure forms - 2007 2006 2005 2004
Assembly Member Douglas H. Fisher, Project Vote Smart
New Jersey Voter Information Website 2003

1947 births
Living people
Bryant University alumni
County commissioners in New Jersey
Democratic Party members of the New Jersey General Assembly
New Jersey city council members
People from Bridgeton, New Jersey
Politicians from Cumberland County, New Jersey
State cabinet secretaries of New Jersey
21st-century American politicians